Vanimo Rural LLG is a local-level government (LLG) of Sandaun Province, Papua New Guinea.

Wards
81. Vanimo Town

References

Local-level governments of Sandaun Province